Chal Khazineh (also Romanized as Chāl Khazīneh) is a village in Sardasht Rural District, in the Central District of Lordegan County, Chaharmahal and Bakhtiari Province, Iran. At the 2006 census, its population was 55, in 11 families.

References 

Populated places in Lordegan County